Bruno Banzer (born 17 June 1947) is a Liechtenstein gymnast. He competed in seven events at the 1972 Summer Olympics.

References

1947 births
Living people
Liechtenstein male artistic gymnasts
Olympic gymnasts of Liechtenstein
Gymnasts at the 1972 Summer Olympics
Place of birth missing (living people)